Darwaz-e Bala, also known as Nusay, is a district in Badakhshan province, Afghanistan. It was created in 2005 from part of Darwaz District.  It is home to approximately 11,000 residents.

This district borders the Shekay, Kuf Ab, and Maimay districts, along with districts in Darvoz, Gorno-Badakhshan Autonomous Province, Tajikistan.

The district was historically part of the Darvaz principality, a semi-independent statelet ruled by a mir.

See also 
 Darwaz
 Darwaz District

References

External links
 Badakhshan Province Map – United Nations Office for the Coordination of Humanitarian Affairs

Districts of Badakhshan Province